Theo Peeters (11 March 1943 – 2 March 2018) was a Belgian neurolinguist who specialised in autism spectrum disorders. During his career he emphasised the importance of understanding the "culture of autism", of empathising fully with individuals on the spectrum. He was the founder of the Opleidingscentrum Autisme (Centre for Training on Autism or OCA) in Antwerp, Belgium.

Biography 
Theo Peeters earned a Licence in Philosophy and Literature (University of Louvain), M.A. in Neurolinguistics (University of Brussels), MSc in Human Communications (University of London) and was affiliated to TEACCH, University of North Carolina at Chapel Hill. He was in charge of training professionals in the 1985 Educational Experiment in Autism sponsored by the Flemish Ministry of Education. Peeters was responsible for the Flemish-Russian project on autism, the Flemish-South African project, the Flemish-Polish Autism project and more. He was also Associate Editor of Good Autism Practice edited by Glenys Jones and Hugh Morgan in partnership with the University of Birmingham. Peeters published several books on autism, including Talking About Autism in 1980, Autism: From Theoretical Understanding to Educational Intervention in 1994 and Autism: Medical and Educational Aspects, in collaboration with Christopher Gillberg.

Selected publications

References

External links
Opleidingscentrum Autisme (Centre for Training in Autism): 
TEACCH University of Northern Carolina at Chapel Hill
An interview with Theo Peeters in Looking Up (International Autism Newsletter) 3:6, 2003.

1943 births
Autism researchers
Living people
Belgian medical researchers